Transversal may refer to:
 Transversal (combinatorics), a set containing exactly one member of each of several other sets
 Transversal (geometry), a line that intersects two or more lines at different points
 Transversal (instrument making), a technique for subdividing graduations
 Transversal Corporation, a software company
 Transversal plane, a geometric concept
 Transversal, relating to the transverse plane in anatomy

See also
 Transverse (disambiguation)
 Transversality (disambiguation)